Christine Caine (née Caryofyllis, 23 September 1966) is an Australian activist, evangelist, author, and international speaker.

Caine and her husband Nick are best known for founding The A21 Campaign in 2008, a 501(c)(3) non-profit, non-governmental organization that combats human trafficking. In 2015, Caine founded Propel Women, an organization that aims to empower women in Christian-related activities. Caine has written numerous books, including "A Life Unleashed", "Run to Win", "Can I Have (And Do) It All, Please?", "The Core Issue", "Undaunted", "Unstoppable", "Unashamed", "Unshakeable," and "Unexpected". She is active in speaking about her faith in God, the local church, and justice at conferences and other events across the globe.

Early life and education
Australian-born and of Greek descent, Christine Caine was adopted at birth by Greek Orthodox immigrants who raised her in public commission housing in Lalor Park, New South Wales, Sydney, Australia. She attended Lynwood Park Public School and Blacktown Girls High School. She graduated from University of Sydney with a degree in English. Caine also attended and graduated from Hillsong College in 1992.

Personal

Caine married Nick Caine in 1996. They have two children.

Ministry

Caine grew up in the Greek Orthodox Church in Australia. She first volunteered as a youth worker, when she helped establish Hills District Youth Service. She went on to become the director of a nationwide youth ministry, Youth Alive. In 2008 she founded the A21 Campaign with her husband Nick, who is now the CEO of A21 and pastor of Zoe Churches. A21 is a 501(c)(3) non-profit, non-governmental organization which fights to "abolish slavery everywhere, forever". With 19 locations in 14 countries, their aim is to prevent human trafficking through awareness, to protect trafficked victims in their shelters and transition homes, to prosecute traffickers and strengthen the legal response to human trafficking, and to partner with law enforcement, individuals, corporations, official bodies, and other non-governmental organizations to end human trafficking in the 21st century.

In January 2015, Caine founded Propel Women, an organization that believes in the passion, purpose, and potential of every woman everywhere. Propel Women exists to honor the calling of every woman, empower her to lead, equip her for success, and develop a sense of God-given purpose.

Caine has also been featured on several international television shows, including TBN's Praise the Lord, Life Today with James Robison, Better Together, Huckabee, Joyce Meyer's Enjoying Everyday Life, and Daystar. In October 2016, TBN launched a weekly TV show featuring Caine called Equip & Empower with Christine Caine.
	
In May 2018, author Carey Scott sued Caine and her publisher, HarperCollins Christian Publishing, for alleged copyright infringement of Scott's work in Caine's book Unashamed (2016) and in a derived work Unshakeable (2017). A settlement was reached in October 2018 and later printings of the works credited Scott's work or were reworded.

Works
Resilient Hope: 100 Devotions for Building Endurance in an Unpredictable World. 2022. ISBN 978-0310457961
How Did I Get Here?: Finding Your Way Back to God When Everything is Pulling You Away. 2021. ISBN 978-1400226566
20/20: Seen. Chosen. Sent. 2019. 
Undaunted: Daring to Do What God Calls You to Do (updated and expanded). 2019. ASIN: 0310355885
Unexpected: Leave Fear Behind, Move Forward in Faith, Embrace the Adventure. 2018. 
Unstoppable: Step Into Your Purpose, Run Your Race, Embrace the Future (with study guide). 2018. ASIN: 0310351367
Unshakeable: 365 Devotions for Finding Unwavering Strength in God’s Word. 2017. 
Unashamed: Drop the Baggage, Pick up Your Freedom, Fulfill Your Destiny. 2016. 
Unstoppable: Running the Race You Were Born to Win. 2014. 
Undaunted: Daring to Do What God Calls You to Do. 2012. 
A Life Unleashed: Giving Birth to Your Dreams. 2012. 
Can I have and Do It All Please? 2009. 
Run to Win: Pursuing God and Finishing Strong. 2008. 
The Core Issue. 2007. ASIN: B008SYRDS2
Stop Acting Like A Christian. Just Be One. 2007. 
Youth Ministry. 2002. 
Certain Uncertainty. 2009. ASIN: B002TVLKL6
Passion: Living Life Large. 2006. ASIN: B0051QYW5M
DNA of a Leader. 2006. ASIN: B00589YV2Q
I’m Not Who I Thought I Was. 2006. ASIN: B001HEM10K
Possessing the Promise. 2005. ASIN: B0084V78DO
Understanding Teenagers. 2005. ASIN: B001O8OQT8
Your Dreams Can Come True. 2005. ASIN: B005C4WGJ2
God Wants You To Win. 2004. ASIN: B009BIDAT0
Relationships: An Issue of the Heart. 2003. ASIN: B005FGOFT6
Activating Your Potential. 2003. ASIN: B007Q1WMHA
Relationships Q&A. 2003. ASIN: B005FGOFT6

References

External links 

Official website
A21 website
Propel Women website

1966 births
Living people
Australian evangelicals
Australian activists
Australian people of Greek descent
People from Sydney
Australian adoptees
University of Sydney alumni
Converts to Protestantism from Eastern Orthodoxy